Balmville Cemetery is a historic cemetery located on the grounds of Mount Saint Mary College at Balmville in Orange County, New York.  It was established in the early 19th century.  It contains approximately 115 graves, most of which date from 1830 to 1860.

It was listed on the National Register of Historic Places in 2009.

References

External links
 

Cemeteries on the National Register of Historic Places in New York (state)
Cemeteries in Orange County, New York
National Register of Historic Places in Orange County, New York